Jiří Svoboda (born 5 May 1945 in Kladno) is a Czech film and TV director, screenwriter and retired politician. He was leader of the Communist Party of Bohemia and Moravia (KSČM) from 1990 to 1993. In 2017 he received the World Prize for Humanism from the Macedonian-based Ohrid Academy of Humanism.

References 

1945 births
Czech politicians
Living people
Communist Party of Bohemia and Moravia politicians
Czech film directors
Czechoslovak film directors
People from Kladno
Leaders of the Communist Party of Bohemia and Moravia